Kim Clijsters was the defending champion, but lost in quarterfinals to Venus Williams.

Amélie Mauresmo won the title, defeating Williams in the final 4–6, 7–5, 6–4.

Seeds
The first four seeds received a bye into the second round.

Draw

Finals

Top half

Bottom half

External links
 WTA tournament draws
 ITF tournament edition details

2005 Singles
Proximus Diamond Games
Proximus Diamond Games